Heterandria is a genus of livebearing fishes within the family Poeciliidae. Most species occur in Guatemala and its surroundings, particularly Mexico, but the midget livebearer (H. formosa) comes from the southeastern United States.

Though many Poecilidae are familiar aquarium fishes, e.g. guppies, mollies, platys and swordtails, species within Heterandria are not commonly kept as fish. Somewhat more frequently found in aquaria is H. formosa, perhaps because it is one of the smallest known fish species in the world; its diminutive males are probably the smallest fish easy to keep as a pet. Species in this genus resemble egg-laying Cyprinodontoidei such as Fundulidae (topminnows) at first glance, and are thus sometimes called "killifish" though this is technically erroneous.

Species
FishBase currently recognize 3 species in this genus, but based on genetics, external characters, morphometrics and meristics H. formosa (the type species of the genus) is not closely related to the remaining, which have been moved to their own genus, Pseudoxiphophorus. There are probably more remaining undiscovered as these fishes are rather inconspicuous. However, it is not very likely that many species remain unknown to science as this genus is only found in a rather restricted region, and only one new species has been discovered since 1980.

The three species classified under this genus are:

 Heterandria attenuata D. E. Rosen & R. M. Bailey, 1979
 Heterandria formosa Girard, 1859 (Dwarf livebearer, least killifish)
 Heterandria tuxtlaensis McEachran & T. J. DeWitt, 2008

References

Poeciliidae
Ovoviviparous fish
Fish of Central America
Freshwater fish of Mexico
Fish of the United States
Freshwater fish genera
Taxa named by Louis Agassiz
Ray-finned fish genera

de:Heterandria